Chahe is a town in Hongze District, Huai'an, Jiangsu. , it administers the residential neighborhoods of Huaibao, Xicheng, Zhangma, and Jianghuai, as well as the following 22 villages:
Chahe Village
Baimahu Village
Tangwei Village
Binhe Village
Nanjie Village
Shitang Village
Qianjin Village
Jiegou Village
Xingfu Village
Dongchen Village
Qihu Village
Duitouji Village
Chenxiang Village
Shendu Village
Taoyuan Village
Tongyi Village
Linze Village
Jinli Village
Qianning Village
Chaoqun Village
Weiji Village
Huaixu Village

References

Huai'an
Township-level divisions of Jiangsu